An oxaziridine is an organic molecule that features a three-membered heterocycle containing oxygen, nitrogen, and carbon. In their largest application, oxaziridines are intermediates in the industrial production of hydrazine.  Oxaziridine derivatives are also used as specialized reagents in organic chemistry for a variety of oxidations, including alpha hydroxylation of enolates, epoxidation and aziridination of olefins, and other heteroatom transfer reactions.  Oxaziridines also serve as precursors to amides and participate in [3+2] cycloadditions with various heterocumulenes to form substituted five-membered heterocycles.  Chiral oxaziridine derivatives effect asymmetric oxygen transfer to prochiral enolates as well as other substrates.  Some oxaziridines also have the property of a high barrier to inversion of the nitrogen, allowing for the possibility of chirality at the nitrogen center.

History
Oxaziridine derivatives were first reported in the mid-1950s by Emmons and subsequently by Krimm and Horner and Jürgens. Whereas oxygen and nitrogen typically act as nucleophiles due to their high electronegativity, oxaziridines allow for electrophilic transfer of both heteroatoms. This unusual reactivity is due to the presence of the highly strained three membered ring and the relatively weak N-O bond. Nucleophiles tend to attack at the aziridine nitrogen when the nitrogen substituent is small (R1= H), and at the oxygen atom when the nitrogen substituent has greater steric bulk. The unusual electronics of the oxaziridine system may be exploited to perform a number of oxygen and nitrogen transfer reactions including, but not limited to: α-hydroxylation of enolates, epoxidation of alkenes, selective oxidation of sulfides and selenides, amination of N-nucleophiles and N-acylamidation.

The peroxide process for the industrial production of hydrazine through the oxidation of ammonia with hydrogen peroxide in the presence of ketones was developed in the early 1970s.

Chiral camphorsulfonyloxaziridines proved useful in the syntheses of complex products, such as taxol which is marketed as a chemotherapy agent. Both the Holton Taxol total synthesis and the Wender Taxol total synthesis feature asymmetric α-hydroxylation with camphorsulfonyloxaziridine.

Synthesis

N-H, N-alkyl, N-aryloxaziridines
The two main approaches to synthesis of N-H, N-alkyl, and N-aryloxaziridines are oxidation of imines with peracids (A) and amination of carbonyls (B).

Additionally, oxidation of chiral imines and oxidation of imines with chiral peracids may yield enantiopure oxaziridines. Some oxaziridines have the unique property of configurationally stable nitrogen atoms at room temperature due to an inversion barrier of 100 to 130 kJ/mol. Enantiopure oxaziridines where stereochemistry is entirely due to configurationally stable nitrogen are reported.

N-sulfonyloxaziridines
In the late 1970s and early 1980s Franklin A. Davis synthesized the first N-sulfonyloxaziridines, which act exclusively as oxygen transfer reagents, and are the most predominantly used class of oxaziridines today. While originally synthesized with mCPBA and the phase transfer catalyst benzyltrimethylammonium chloride, an improved synthesis using oxone as the oxidant is now most prevalent.

Many N-sulfonyloxaziridines are used today, each with slightly different properties and reactivity. These reagents are summarized in the table below.

Perfluorinated oxaziridines

With highly electron withdrawing perfluoroalkyl substituents, oxaziridines exhibit reactivity more similar to that of dioxiranes than typical oxaziridines. Notably, perfluoroalkyloxaziridines hydroxylate certain C-H bonds with high selectivity.  Perfluorinated oxaziridines may be synthesized by subjecting a perfluorinated imine to perfluoromethyl fluorocarbonyl peroxide and a metal fluoride to act as an HF scavenger.

Reactions

Hydrazine production
Oxaziridines are intermediates in the peroxide process for the production of hydrazine. Many millions of kilograms of hydrazine are produced annually by this method that involves a step wherein ammonia is oxidized in the presence of methyl ethyl ketone to give the oxaziridine:
Me(Et)C=O + NH3 + H2O2 → Me(Et)CONH + H2O
In subsequent steps the oxaziridine is converted to the hydrazone, which is the immediate in the way to hydrazine:
Me(Et)CONH + NH3 → Me(Et)C=NNH2 + H2O

Oxygen transfer

α-Hydroxylation of enolates
α-Hydroxyketones, or acyloins, are an important synthetic motifs present in many natural products. α-Hydroxyketones have been synthesized in many ways, including reduction of α-diketones, substitution of a hydroxyl for a leaving group and direct oxidation of an enolate.  Oxodiperoxymolybdenum(pyridine)-(hexamethylphosphoric triamide) (MoOPH) and N-sulfonyloxaziridines are the most common electrophilic sources of oxygen implemented in this process. One advantage of using N-sulfonyloxaziridines is that higher chiral induction is almost invariably observed relative to MoOPH and other oxidants. High yield (77–91%) and dr (95:5 – 99:1) are reported for α-hydroxylation with the Evans' chiral auxiliary with N-sulfonyloxaziridine as the electrophile. Chiral induction has been demonstrated with many other chiral ketones and ketones with chiral auxiliaries, including SAMP and RAMP.

Extensive work has been reported on asymmetric hydroxylation of prochiral enolates with camphorsulfonyloxaziridine derivatives, achieving moderate to high enantiomeric excess.  The commonly accepted proposed transition state that justifies this stereochemical outcome involves an open transition state where the steric bulk of R1 determines the face of approach.

The selectivity of some hydroxylations may be drastically improved in some cases with the addition of coordinating groups alpha to the oxaziridine ring as oxaziridines 3b and 3c in the table above. In these instances it is proposed that the reaction proceeds through a closed transition state where the metal oxyanion is stabilized by chelation from the sulfate and coordinating groups on the camphor skeleton.

α-Hydroxylation with oxaziridines has been widely implemented in total synthesis. It is a key step in both the Holton Taxol total synthesis and the Wender Taxol total synthesis. Additionally, Forsyth implemented the transformation in his synthesis of the C3-C14 (substituted 1,7-Dioxaspiro[5.5]undec-3-ene) System of okadaic acid.

Epoxidation of alkenes
Epoxidation of alkenes is a common reaction because epoxides can be derivatized in a number of useful ways. Classically, laboratory epoxidation is carried out with mCPBA or other peracids. Oxaziridines have been found to be useful for the formation of highly acid sensitive epoxides. (−)-Chaetominine was synthesized via oxaziridine epoxidation as a late stage transformation as seen below.

Another transformation of high synthetic utility is asymmetric epoxidation. A number of asymmetric epoxidations exist: the Sharpless epoxidation, the Jacobsen-Katsuki epoxidation, and the Juliá-Colonna epoxidation. These methods require specific functionality in order to achieve selectivity. The Sharpless epoxidation is specific to allylic alcohols, the Jacobsen epoxidation requires cis-disubstituted aryl alkenes, and the Juliá epoxidation requires α-β unsaturated ketones. Chiral oxaziridines act stereospecifically on many unfunctionalized alkenes. It has even possible to effect stereospecific epoxidation catalytically in the oxaziridine chiral unit. Further investigation into these reactions may be required before levels of enantiometic excess become practical for large scale synthesis. Lusinichi et al. have investigated asymmetric epoxidation with a chiral oxaziridinium salt using oxone as the stoichiometric oxidant seen below.

Hydroxylation of unactivated hydrocarbons
Perfluorinated oxaziridines are known to hydroxylate unactivated hydrocarbons with remarkable regio- and diastereospecificity. This is a highly coveted transformation, and similar reactivity and specificity is seldom rivaled, especially considering the nonmetallic nature of the oxidant. Perfluorinated oxaziridines show high selectivity toward tertiary hydrogens. Hydroxylation of primary carbons and dihydroxylation of a compound with two oxidizable sites have never been observed. Retention of stereochemistry is very high, often 95 to 98%. (Retention of stereochemistry may be further enhanced by the addition of a fluoride salt).

Nitrogen transfer
Oxaziridines with unsubstituted or acylated nitrogens are capable of nitrogen atom transfer, although this reactivity has received considerably less attention.

Amination of N-nucleophiles
Amination of nucleophiles with  N-unsubstituted oxaziridines is quite versatile in the breadth of possible nucleophiles and corresponding products.  Hydrazines may be derived from the amination of secondary or tertiary amines, hydroxylamine and thiohydroxamines may be formed from their corresponding alcohols and thiols, sulfimides may be formed from thioethers and α-aminoketones may be formed by attack of corresponding enolates.

N-acylamidation
The transfer of acylated amines is more difficult than that of unsubstituted amines, although, unlike amine transfer by oxaziridines, there are no alternative methods that directly transfer acylated amines. Acylamine transfer has primarily been performed using amines and hydrazines as nucleophiles. Very few transfers of acylated nitrogens to carbon nucleophiles have been successfully performed, although some do exist in the literature.

Rearrangements
Oxaziridines have been found to undergo rearrangement reactions via a radical mechanism when irradiated with UV light or in the presence of a single electron transfer reagent such as CuI. spirocylic oxaziridines undergo ring expansions to the corresponding lactam. The migrating substituent is determined by a stereoelectronic effect where the group trans to the lone pair on the nitrogen will always be the predominant migration product. In light of this effect, it is possible to take advantage of the chiral nitrogen due to high inversion barrier to direct the rearrangement. This phenomenon is demonstrated by observed selectivities in the rearrangements below. In the rearrangement on the left the thermodynamically unfavorable product is observed exclusively, while in the reaction on the right the product derived from the less stable radical intermediate is favored.

Aubé takes advantage of this rearrangement as the key step in his synthesis of (+)-yohimbine, a natural medicine classified by the NIH as possibly effective in the treatment of erectile dysfunction and the sexual problems caused by selective serotonin reuptake inhibitors.

It is also notable that oxaziridines will thermally rearrange to nitrones. Cis-trans selectivity of the resulting nitrone is poor, however, yields are good to excellent. It is thought that some oxaziridines racemize over time through a nitrone intermediate.

Cycloadditions with heterocumulenes
Oxaziridines undergo cycloaddition reactions with heterocumulenes to afford a number of unique five membered heterocycles, as shown in the figure below. This reactivity is due to the strained three membered ring and weak N-O bond.

References

Functional groups
Nitrogen heterocycles
Oxygen heterocycles
Reagents for organic chemistry
Three-membered rings